Star Song Communications is a Christian record label that was started in 1976 by Wayne Donowho, who recruited his friend Darrell Harris. It gained notoriety when it issued Resurrection Band's ground-breaking debut album, Awaiting Your Reply in 1978. Originally, a distribution deal was made with Benson Records. From 1983 until 1986, distribution was done by Word Records. After that, a deal was made with Sparrow Records. Independent distribution was started in 1989, and picked up distribution for ForeFront records and DC Talk in 1991. This distribution was maintained until the sale of the company to EMI, and the launch of Chordant Distribution in 1994.

Pure Metal Records was acquired from Refuge Records in 1990.

In 1998, it was announced that Star Song would only be used to issue reprints, and their artists would be transferred to Sparrow.

Artists 

 Tom Autry
 Brian Barrett
 Barren Cross
 Bash 'n the Code
 Chris Beatty
 Benjamin
 Bob Bennett
 Aaron Benward
 Jeoffrey Benward
 Bride
 Keith Brown
 Chalice
 Steve & Annie Chapman
 Kemper Crabb
 Morgan Cryar
 Family Force 5
 Farrell & Farrell
 Don Francisco
 Disciples of Christ (later known as D.O.C. )
 Gaither Vocal Band
 Steve Geyer
 Giantkiller
 Jim Gill
 Pam Mark Hall
 Glass Harp
 Bryn Haworth
 Jeffrey Herrmann
 Maureen Herrmann
 Kim Hill
 Jimmy Hotz
 The Imperials
 In Reach
 Aaron Jeoffrey
 Justus
 King James
 Mylon LeFevre
 Mylon & Broken Heart
 Liberation Suite
 Debbie McClendon
 David Meece
 Kevin Max
 Tony Melendez
 Newsboys
 Nichole Nordeman
 Novella
 Jerome Olds
 John Pantry
 Painted Orange
 Twila Paris
 Michael Peace
 Matt Redman
 Michael Peace
 Petra
 Phillips, Craig and Dean
 Quickflight
 Dave Reader
 The RapSures
 Reality Check
 Linnae Reeves
 Resurrection Band
 David Robertson
 Say What?
 Scepter
 Jeff Scheetz
 Seraiah
 Seth
 Paul Smith
 Sierra
 The Swirling Eddies
 Two Hearts
 Tony Vincent
 The Walter Eugenes
 White Heart
 Whitecross
 Fletch Wiley
 Stephen Wiley
 Xalt

Compilations 
Never Say Dinosaur (1996)

See also 
 List of Christian record labels

References

External links 
 EMI CMG Official Website

American record labels
Record labels established in 1976
Christian record labels
EMI
1976 establishments in the United States
Online mass media companies